The list of ship decommissionings in 1967 includes a chronological list of all ships decommissioned in 1967.


See also 

1967
 Ship decommissionings
Ship